Rust Never Sleeps is an album with both studio and live tracks by Canadian American singer-songwriter Neil Young and American band Crazy Horse. It was released on June 22, 1979, by Reprise Records. Most of the album was recorded live, then overdubbed in the studio, while others originated in the studio. Young used the phrase "rust never sleeps" as a concept for his tour with Crazy Horse to avoid artistic complacency and try more progressive, theatrical approaches to performing live.

Background and recording 
The album was recorded in 1978 during the lengthy "Rust Never Sleeps" tour, in which Young played a wealth of new material. The concert tour was divided into a solo acoustic set and an electric set with Crazy Horse. The electric sets, featuring an abrasive style of guitar playing, were influenced by the punk rock zeitgeist of the late 1970s and, provided a stark contrast from Young's previous, folk-inspired album Comes a Time.

Two new songs, the acoustic "My My, Hey Hey (Out of the Blue)" and electric "Hey Hey, My My (Into the Black)" were the centerpiece of the new material. The solo portions of the album including, "My My, Hey Hey (Out of the Blue)", "Thrasher" and "Ride My Llama" were recorded live in San Francisco at the Boarding House between May 24 and May 28, 1978. Two songs from the album were not recorded live: "Sail Away" was recorded without Crazy Horse during or after the Comes a Time recording sessions,  and "Pocahontas" had been recorded solo in 1976 (original recording without overdubs was released in 2017 on archival release Hitchhiker).

After his final performance at the Boarding House on May 28, Young collaborated with the art punk band Devo on a cacophonous version of "Hey Hey, My My (Into the Black)" at the Different Fur studio in San Francisco and, would later introduce the song to Crazy Horse. During the Different Fur studio session, Devo vocalist Mark Mothersbaugh added the lyrics "Rust never sleeps", a slogan he remembered from his graphic arts career promoting the automobile rust proofing product Rust-Oleum. Young adopted the line and used it in his Crazy Horse version of the song, as well as for the title of his album. The lyrics, "It's better to burn out than to fade away." were widely quoted by his peers and by critics.

The electric sets were recorded during the Neil Young/Crazy Horse tour in late 1978, with overdubs added later. Audience noise is removed as much as possible, although it is clearly audible at certain points, most noticeably on the opening and closing songs.

Critical reception 

Reviewing for The Village Voice in 1979, Robert Christgau called Rust Never Sleeps Young's best album yet and said although his melodies are unsurprisingly simple and original, his lyrics are surprisingly and offhandedly complex. "He's wiser but not wearier", Christgau wrote, "victor so far over the slow burnout his title warns of". Paul Nelson, writing in Rolling Stone magazine, found its first side virtuosic because of how Young transcends the songs' acoustic settings with his commanding performance and was impressed by its themes of personal escape and exhaustion, the role of rock music, and American violence: "Rust Never Sleeps tells me more about my life, my country and rock & roll than any music I've heard in years." Rust Never Sleeps was voted the second best album of 1979 in The Village Voices annual Pazz & Jop critics poll. Christgau, the poll's creator, ranked it second on his own list for the poll, as did fellow critic Greil Marcus. The album also won Rolling Stone magazine's 1979 critics poll for Album of the Year. In a decade-end list for The Village Voice, Christgau named it the ninth best album of the 1970s.

In 2000, Rust Never Sleeps was voted number 240 in the third edition of Colin Larkin's All Time Top 1000 Albums book. In 2003, it was ranked number 350 on Rolling Stone magazine's list of the 500 greatest albums of all time. Rolling Stone re-ranked the album at 351 in the list's 2012 edition, and later at number 296 in the 2020 edition. In a retrospective review, Greg Kot of the Chicago Tribune said that the acoustic and electric sides were both astounding. AllMusic's William Ruhlmann viewed that Young reinvigorated himself artistically by being imaginative and bold, and in the process created an exemplary album that "encapsulated his many styles on a single disc with great songs — in particular the remarkable 'Powderfinger' — unlike any he had written before." Rob Sheffield, writing in The Rolling Stone Album Guide (2004), felt that "Powderfinger", "Pocahontas", "Thrasher", and "Hey Hey, My My (Into the Black)" were among Young's greatest songs.

Track listing
All tracks written by Neil Young except where noted.

Personnel 
Neil Young – vocals, guitars, harmonica, organ, percussion

with (on "Sail Away")
Nicolette Larson – vocals
Joe Osborn – bass
Karl T. Himmel – drums

Crazy Horse (on side two)
Frank "Poncho" Sampedro – electric guitar, backing vocals
Billy Talbot – bass, backing vocals
Ralph Molina – drums, backing vocals

Charts 

Singles

Year End Chart

Certifications

Concert film of the same name
A film of the same name was released on 15 August 1979 in the USA, featuring the October 22, 1978 concert performance at the Cow Palace.

Track listing:

		Sugar Mountain
		I Am A Child
		Comes A Time
		After The Gold Rush
		Thrasher
		My My, Hey Hey (Out Of The Blue)
		When You Dance I Can Really Love
		The Loner
		Welfare Mothers
		The Needle And The Damage Done
		Lotta Love
		Sedan Delivery
		Powderfinger
		Cortez The Killer
		Cinnamon Girl
		Like A Hurricane
		Hey Hey, My My (Into The Black)
		Tonight's The Night [not present in the theatrical release, only in Video/DVD releases]

References

Sources

External links 
 
 Film: 

Album chart usages for New Zealand
Neil Young live albums
Crazy Horse (band) albums
1979 live albums
Reprise Records live albums
Albums produced by David Briggs (producer)
Albums produced by Neil Young